Santo António da Serra is a civil parish in the municipality of Santa Cruz on the Portuguese island of Madeira. The parish is adjacent to another parish in the neighbouring municipality of Machico to the north, which is also named Santo António da Serra. The population in 2011 was 936, in an area of 14.75 km².

Geography
It is located west of Machico and east-northeast of the regional capital of Funchal. The parish contains the localities João Ferino, Pereira, Madre d'Água, Curral Velho, Ribeira de João Gonçalves, Achada do Barro, Fajã da Ovelha and Serrado das Amexieiras.

References

Freguesias of Santa Cruz, Madeira